Jawalakhel YC, also known as Jawalakhel Youth Club, is a Nepali professional football club from Jawalakhel, Lalitpur, Nepal. They play in the Nepalese first division, the Martyr's Memorial A-Division League.

Current squad

Current Technical Squad

League finishes
The season-by-season performance of JYC since 2000:

References 

Football clubs in Nepal
1972 establishments in Nepal